"Kiss Kiss" is a song recorded by South Korean girl group Ladies' Code. It was released as a single album on August 7, 2014 by Polaris Entertainment and is the group's fifth single overall. This was the last release featuring members EunB and RiSe, around a month before their deaths in September 2014.

Track listing 
 The song was written, composed and arranged by Super Changddai.

Chart performance

Albums chart

Singles chart

Sales and certifications

Release history

References

External links
 

Songs about kissing
Korean-language songs
2014 singles
Ladies' Code songs
2014 songs